Anil Dhirubhai Ambani (born 4 June 1959) is an Indian businessman. He was the chairman of Reliance Group (also known as Reliance ADA Group), which was created in July 2006 following a demerger from Reliance Industries Limited. He leads a number of stocks listed corporations including Reliance Capital, Reliance Infrastructure, Reliance Power and Reliance Communications.

Ambani, once the sixth richest person in the world, declared before a UK court in February 2020 that his net worth is zero and he is bankrupt, although the veracity of that claim is in question. He served in the Rajya Sabha, the upper house of the Parliament of India from Uttar Pradesh as an Independent MP between 2004 and 2006.

Life and education
Anil Ambani is the younger son of the founder of Reliance Industries, Dhirubhai Ambani and his wife Kokilaben.
Ambani has said that his father would lead the brothers on "incentive-oriented outings" where they would be rewarded a box of mangoes for a 10-km (6 mile) hike, but also punished them for acting out in front of guests. He earned his Bachelor of Science degree from Kishinchand Chellaram College and received a Master in Business Administration at the Wharton School of the University of Pennsylvania in 1983.

Business career
Ambani's father Dhirubhai died in 2002 without leaving a clear succession plan. After bickering between Anil and his brother Mukesh, their mother Kokilaben mediated and split the family owned businesses between the two brothers.

Anil Ambani received parts of Reliance Group with interests in telecom, entertainment, financial services, power and infrastructure. Ambani is also credited with India's largest IPO, that of Reliance Power, which in 2008 was subscribed in less than 60 seconds, the fastest in the history of Indian capital markets to date.

In 2005 Ambani made his debut in the entertainment industry with an acquisition of a majority stake in Adlabs Films, a company with interests in film processing, production, exhibition and digital cinema. The company was renamed Reliance MediaWorks in 2009.
In 2008 a joint venture worth US$1.2 billion with Steven Spielberg's production company DreamWorks cast Ambani's entertainment business on to a global platform. He has contributed to the production of several Spielberg films, including the Academy Award-winning Lincoln.

Ambani gained notoriety as one of the fastest destroyers of shareholder wealth in the last 100 years with the combined group market cap declining by 90% since the formation of the Reliance ADA Group.

In early 2019, a court in Mumbai held Ambani in criminal contempt for non-payment of personally guaranteed debt Reliance Communications owed to Swedish gear maker Ericsson. Instead of jail time, the court gave him a month to come up with the funds. At the end of the month, Ambani was bailed out by his elder brother, Mukesh Ambani.

In April 2019, three ADAG Companies reached standstill agreement with Franklin Templeton after secured NCD default. This led to SEBI changing mutual fund regulation of reducing unlisted NCDs exposure to 10% and making standstill agreement void. In aftermath, FT India didn't sell the pledged securities and wound 6 debt funds affecting 300,000 investors.

In February 2020, Anil Ambani was locked in a legal battle with 3 Chinese banks. He was asked to set aside  by the court which led him to make the statement that his net worth is currently zero after considering his liabilities.

In October 2021, Anil Ambani was named in the Pandora Papers along with his brother Mukesh. In January 2023, the Bombay High Court questioned the Income Tax Department's accusation of tax evasion against Anil Ambani after a petition by him challenged the decision of the notice issued by the I-T department.

Personal life
Ambani belongs to a Gujarati family which hails from the village of Chorwad near Junagarh in the Kathiawar region of Gujarat state. He is the son of the legendary petroleum entrepreneur Dhirubhai Ambani and his wife, Smt. Kokilaben Ambani, a devoted home-maker who has founded the Kokilaben Dhirubhai Ambani Hospital in suburban Mumbai. Anil is one of four children. He has an older brother, Mukesh Ambani, and two sisters, Smt. Nina Kothari (wife of late Bhadra Shyam Kothari) and Smt. Deepti Salgaocar (wife of Dattaraj Salgoncar).

Anil Ambani is married to the actress Tina Munim. He married her after facing much resistance from his family, due to the fact that she came from the world of fashion and glamour, and her lifestyle choices before marriage had been unconventional. Nevertheless, the couple have had a stable marriage and have been blessed with two sons, Jai Anmol Ambani and Jai Anshul Ambani. On 20 February 2022, Ambani's elder son, Jai Anmol, married Krisha Shah, daughter of the late Nikunj Shah, a Mumbai-based entrepreneur.

Awards and recognition
 Conferred the 'Businessman of the Year 1997' award by India's leading business magazine Business India, December 1998.
 Voted 'the Businessman of the Year' in a poll conducted by The Times of India – TNS, December 2006.
 Voted the 'Best role model' among business leaders in the biannual Mood of the Nation poll conducted by India Today magazine, August 2006.
 Conferred 'the CEO of the Year 2004' in the Platts Global Energy Awards.
 Conferred 'The Entrepreneur of the Decade Award' by the Bombay Management Association, October 2002.
 Awarded the First Wharton Indian Alumni Award by the Wharton India Economic Forum (WIEF) in recognition of his contribution to the establishment of Reliance as a global leader in many of its business areas, December 2001.
 Selected by Asiaweek magazine for its list of 'Leaders of the Millennium in Business and Finance' and was introduced as the only 'new hero' in Business and Finance from India, June 1999.

Allegations of political connections
In 2018, India's principal opposition party, Indian National Congress, accused Prime Minister Narendra Modi of favouring Anil Ambani's defence manufacturing company over HAL, a public sector enterprise, in a fighter aircraft deal worth  with French manufacturing firm Dassault. Ambani, several of whose companies are debt-ridden, has denied all charges of benefiting from crony capitalism. In factual terms, Reliance Defence stood to get just over 3 per cent of the  Dassault Aviation offsets contract, contrary to the impression that it was to be the biggest beneficiary of the Rafale fighter jet deal.

In a possibly related controversy, one of his businesses partly financed a French film in which former French president Francois Hollande's then-partner had acted around the same time the aircraft deal was being negotiated.

References

External links

 profile at aaajjtak
 Profile  at Reliance ADAG
 Profile at Forbes
 
 
 Anil Ambani: collected news and commentary at The Times of India

1959 births
Anil
Gujarati people
Indian chief executives
Indian industrialists
21st-century Indian philanthropists
Living people
University of Mumbai alumni
Wharton School of the University of Pennsylvania alumni
Businesspeople from Mumbai
20th-century Indian businesspeople
Reliance Group people
Rajya Sabha members from Uttar Pradesh
Independent politicians in India
Former billionaires
Hill Grange High School alumni
People named in the Pandora Papers
21st-century industrialists
20th-century Indian philanthropists